Newsome is a ward of Huddersfield in the metropolitan borough of Kirklees, West Yorkshire, England.   It contains over 430 listed buildings that are recorded in the National Heritage List for England.  Of these, one is listed at Grade I, the highest of the three grades, 16 are at Grade II*, the middle grade, and the others are at Grade II, the lowest grade.  The ward is large, and contains the centre of the town of Huddersfield, and areas to the west and south.  This list contains the listed buildings outside the centre of the town, namely those outside the ring road, and include the areas of Almondbury, Armitage Bridge, Aspley, Highfields, Lockwood, Longley, Lowerhouses, Moldgreen, Newsome, Rashcliffe, Springwood, and Taylor Hill.  The listed buildings in the central area within the ring road are at Listed buildings in Huddersfield (Newsome Ward - central area)

To the south of the town the Huddersfield Broad Canal joins the Huddersfield Narrow Canal, and the listed buildings associated with them are a canal basin, a warehouse, locks, and a bridge.  The area to the west of the town is mainly residential, immediately to the south of the town is an area involved with the textile industry, and further to the south are villages and smaller settlements, and the surrounding countryside.

Most of the listed buildings in the area to the west of the town centre are houses and associated structures, and the others include churches and related items, and a former infirmary with a statue in the forecourt.  The textile area includes mills, shops, public houses, and portals to railway tunnels.  Further to the south, most of the listed buildings are houses and cottages, farmhouses and farm buildings, former textile mills, churches and associated structures, a road bridge, a railway viaduct, a former spa baths and an associated hotel.


Key

Buildings

References

Citations

Sources

Lists of listed buildings in West Yorkshire
Buildings and structures in Huddersfield